Mikel González de Martín Martínez (born 24 September 1985) is a Spanish footballer who plays for Cypriot club AEK Larnaca FC as a central defender.

He spent most of his professional career with Real Sociedad, playing 299 competitive games and scoring six goals.

Club career

Real Sociedad
A product of Real Sociedad's youth ranks, González was born in Arrasate-Mondragón, Gipuzkoa, and he made his first-team debut on 17 September 2005 in a 5–2 away loss against RCD Mallorca. He went on to collect only two more La Liga appearances during that season.

With the Basque team in Segunda División, González became an undisputed starter, appearing in 35 games in the 2009–10 campaign as Real returned to the top flight after a three-year absence and contributing one goal, in a 2–1 home victory over Villarreal CF B. He added 32 matches – 30 starts – the following year as the club retained its league status, but somewhat lost his importance in the squad following the January 2011 signing of Norwegian Vadim Demidov and the emergence of youth product Iñigo Martínez.

González returned to starting duties in the following seasons, alongside Martínez: he started in all his 34 league appearances in 2012–13 in more than 3.000 minutes of action, scoring against Rayo Vallecano (4–0, at home) and Valencia CF (5–2 away win) as the Txuriurdin finished fourth and returned to the UEFA Champions League after one full decade.

González made his debut in the Champions League on 17 September 2013, playing the full 90 minutes in a 0–2 group phase home loss to FC Shakhtar Donetsk. He added a further four games in that stage of the competition, as his team ranked last.

In April 2017, by now a backup member of the squad, González made what was calculated to be his 300th appearance for Real Sociedad. It was his final match serving the club, with his contract not renewed on its expiry the following month.

Zaragoza
On 29 August 2017, free agent González signed a two-year deal with Real Zaragoza in the second division. He scored his first and only goal for the Aragonese – play-offs notwithstanding– on 2 October, helping the visitors draw 2–2 at Real Oviedo.

González terminated his contract on 8 July 2018.

AEK Larnaca
On 3 July 2018, the 32-year-old González moved abroad for the first time in his career and joined Cypriot First Division club AEK Larnaca FC on a one-year contract.

Honours
Real Sociedad
Segunda División: 2009–10

AEK Larnaca
Cypriot Super Cup: 2018

References

External links

1985 births
Living people
People from Mondragón
Spanish footballers
Footballers from the Basque Country (autonomous community)
Association football defenders
La Liga players
Segunda División players
Segunda División B players
Real Sociedad B footballers
Real Sociedad footballers
Real Zaragoza players
Cypriot First Division players
AEK Larnaca FC players
Basque Country international footballers
Spanish expatriate footballers
Expatriate footballers in Cyprus
Spanish expatriate sportspeople in Cyprus